{{Infobox station
| name                = Saltcoats
| symbol_location     = gb
| symbol              = rail
| image               = Saltcoats railway station, old offices and station master's house, North Ayrshire, Scotland.jpg
| caption             = Saltcoats railway station, looking east towards Stevenston
| borough             = Saltcoats, North Ayrshire
| country             = Scotland
| coordinates         = 
| grid_name           = Grid reference
| grid_position       = 
| manager             = ScotRail
| platforms           = 2
| code                = SLT
| transit_authority   = SPT
| original            = Ardrossan Railway
| pregroup            = Glasgow and South Western Railway
| postgroup           = LMS
| years               = 27 July 1840
| events              = Opened as Saltcoats
| years1              = 1 July 1858
| events1             = Relocated due west
| years2              = 1882
| events2             = Relocated between two previous sites
| years3              = 30 June 1952
| events3             = Renamed Saltcoats Central
| years4              = 4 February 1965
| events4             = Renamed Saltcoats
| mpassengers =

| footnotes           = Passenger statistics from the Office of Rail and Road
}}Saltcoats railway station is a railway station serving the town of Saltcoats, North Ayrshire, Scotland. The station is managed by ScotRail and is on the Ayrshire Coast Line.

 History 
The station originally opened on 27 July 1840 by the Ardrossan Railway. The station was relocated a short distance west of the original location on 1 July 1858 and relocated again to its present location (between the first two sites) in 1882. The station was known as Saltcoats Central''' from 30 June 1952 to 4 February 1965, when it was renamed back to its original name.

Station description 

Saltcoats station has two large station buildings, one of which is still in use as a ticket office. The second building on the westbound platform was once used as the station offices and station master's house, and is now a cafe.

Services 

On Sundays there is an hourly service eastbound to Glasgow Central and westbound to Largs, plus five trains to Ardrossan Harbour to connect with the ferry to the Isle of Arran.

References

Notes

Sources

External links
Video footage of Saltcoats station.

Railway stations in North Ayrshire
Former Glasgow and South Western Railway stations
Railway stations in Great Britain opened in 1840
Railway stations in Great Britain closed in 1858
Railway stations in Great Britain opened in 1858
Railway stations in Great Britain closed in 1882
Railway stations in Great Britain opened in 1882
Railway stations served by ScotRail
SPT railway stations